Lucano may refer to:

People
Domenico Lucano, mayor of Italian city of Riace

Places
in the Southern Italian region of Basilicata, Italy  
Muro Lucano, a city and comune in the province of Potenza
Oliveto Lucano, a town and comune in the province of Matera
Oppido Lucano, a town and comune in the province of Potenza
San Giorgio Lucano, a town and comune in the province of Matera
San Severino Lucano, a town and comune in the province of Potenza
Angola
Luacano, a municipality in Moxico Province, Angola

Others
Amaro Lucano, Italian liqueur in the Amaro category produced by Amaro Lucano S.p.A., a family-owned company based in Pisticci, Basilicata
Calore Lucano (or Calore Salernitano), a river in Campania, southern Italy, in the province of Salerno, within Cilento and an important left tributary of the Sele. In ancient times it was known as Calor

See also
Lugano